Soilwork is a Swedish melodic death metal band from Helsingborg. They are signed to Nuclear Blast. Formed in late 1995 by Björn Strid and Peter Wichers, originally under the name Inferior Breed, the band changed their name in late 1996 to Soilwork (meaning "working from the ground up").

History

Early years (1995–2000)
The band was formed in late 1995, originally under the name Inferior Breed. Their sound, as explained by "Speed" was influenced by such bands as Pantera, Meshuggah, and Carcass. Upon changing their band name in late 1996 to Soilwork, they began to make more melodic music.  Soilwork began work on a demo entitled In Dreams We Fall into the Eternal Lake. Before the recording ever took place, bassist Carl-Gustav Döös left the group, leaving guitarist Peter Wichers to handle the bass tracks on the demo. In a chance encounter, Soilwork met Michael Amott of Arch Enemy fame, who owned a record store in Helsingborg, and gave him a copy of their demo. This ultimately led to the band signing with Listenable Records. The band had huge changes which saw them change dramatically,  giving rise to the guitar mastery of David Andersson. 
Not only did Andersson influence Soilwork but he also guest starred with Australian Demonic Drug metallers, Gangs of Old Ladies.

In 1998, Soilwork added keyboardist Carlos Holmberg and bassist Ola Flink. The band recorded and released their debut album Steelbath Suicide in May of that year. Soon after, guitarist Ludvig Svartz and drummer Jimmy Persson left, citing "different musical opinions". Persson (now guitar and vocals in Faithful Darkness) was replaced by Henry Ranta, while Svartz was replaced by Peter Wichers' uncle, Ola Frenning. The band toured throughout Europe in support of the album with bands such as Darkane, Naglfar, and Krisiun.

In 1999, Soilwork recorded their second full-length album, The Chainheart Machine but it was released in 2000. The album received critical acclaim and eventually landed them a recording contract with label Nuclear Blast, allowing the band to tour with acts such as Defleshed, Cannibal Corpse, and even, briefly, with fellow melodic death metallers Dark Tranquillity.

Rise to popularity (2000–2006)
In 2000, after exhausting themselves with touring, Soilwork returned to the studio to record their third full-length album, A Predator's Portrait. The release was well received and brought Soilwork to the forefront of the melodic death metal scene, alongside label mates In Flames. The band played at Wacken Open Air that year, and toured extensively with Annihilator and Nevermore.

Following up on their success, Soilwork entered the studio again in late 2001 to record the follow-up to A Predator's Portrait with Devin Townsend and Fredrik Nordström. Natural Born Chaos was released in early 2002, to much acclaim as well. Soilwork toured throughout Europe to support the album, and, for the first time, throughout the United States, first with bands Hypocrisy, Scar Culture, Chimaira, Unearth and Killswitch Engage during the summer, then alongside label mates In Flames during the fall. After touring, they started writing and recording their fifth album.

In December 2002, Soilwork entered the studio to begin recording their fifth album. After recording, the band began a European tour with Children of Bodom and Shadows Fall throughout April and May. That same month, Figure Number Five was released. In early June, drummer Henry Ranta left the band, to focus more on his personal life, and was replaced a week later by Richard Evensand. The band then embarked on another North American tour with In Flames, Chimaira, and Unearth. In September, Soilwork toured Japan with Children of Bodom. Merely days after a short mini-trek tour through Japan, Soilwork also toured Australia briefly. Later that year, they again toured North America with Chimaira, As I Lay Dying and Bleeding Through. After the tour, Richard Evensand left the band to replace drummer Andols Herrick who had recently left Chimaira. Soilwork initially announced his temporary replacement as Dirk Verbeuren of Scarve. Verbeuren would later become the full-time replacement. In early 2004, singer Björn "Speed" Strid laid down tracks with Italian melodic death metal band Disarmonia Mundi. During April, the band announced that it had extended its contract with record label Nuclear Blast Records. That same month the band again toured Australia alongside Anthrax, Embodiment 12:14, and Killswitch Engage. In mid-2004, Soilwork toured Japan for a second time alongside Dark Tranquillity.

Soilwork entered Dug Out Studios on 14 September 2004 to begin recording their sixth full-length album, Stabbing the Drama. A week later the band changed venues and recorded at Fascination Street Studios. Stabbing the Drama was released in early March 2005. The album entered the Finnish charts at number 19, and in Sweden at number 14. The band also began to gain minor commercial success in the United States. Stabbing the Drama reached No. 12 and No. 21 on the Billboard Heatseeker and Independent album charts, respectively. The band partook in the 2005 Ozzfest, performing on the second stage. In November the band toured stateside with Fear Factory. In late 2005, guitarist Peter Wichers left the band due to tour exhaustion and other personal issues. The same month, Strid announced he was working on a second album with Disarmomia Mundi. In May 2006, Daniel Antonsson was announced as the replacement for Peter Wichers. Soilwork spent the summer appearing at festivals throughout Europe. In September they toured throughout the UK and Turkey. The band later pulled out of the Turkish dates, due to terrorist attacks and bombings that had recently occurred to tourists there. In October the band trekked North America, this time with Darkest Hour, Mnemic and Threat Signal.

Transitional period and continued popularity (2007–2015)
In early March 2007, Soilwork began laying down the tracks for their seventh album, Sworn to a Great Divide Late in June, Ola Frenning announced that the album was finished. Soilwork toured in the fall alongside Caliban, Sonic Syndicate, and Dark Tranquillity in a tour dubbed, 'Eastpak Antidote' tour. The album was released on 19 October 2007 through Nuclear Blast. The album sports a sound closer to thrash than their previous albums, though still backed by their trademark synth elements. The band took part on an American tour with co-headliners Lamb of God and Killswitch Engage, as well as DevilDriver. The tour began on 28 November 2007 at the Tsongas Arena in Lowell, Massachusetts, and ended at the Santa Ana Star Center in Rio Rancho, New Mexico on 17 December 2007. The tour, dubbed The Clash of the Titans Tour 2007, appeared in Grand Prairie, TX at the Nokia Live Theatre on 8 December 2007 to play for the entire Dallas/Fort Worth metroplex. On 12 February 2008, an official statement was posted on Soilwork's official website that Ola Frenning and Soilwork had decided to part ways, his replacement came in the form of Sylvain Coudret. In another statement on 18 September 2008, it was revealed that guitarist Daniel Antonsson would be replaced with the return of former guitarist and founding member Peter Wichers and also that Sylvain Coudret from the band Scarve who has been doing session work as second guitarist during 2008 Summer festivals became permanent guitar player for the band.

The band returned to the studio in early 2010 to write and record their eighth album, later on with Strid announcing on 22 January 2010 in a MySpace bulletin that the new album would be entitled The Panic Broadcast. On 30 June 2010, The Sledgehammer Files: The Best of Soilwork 1998–2008 greatest hits comlilation album was released, followed shortly by the band's new album The Panic Broadcast on 2 July in Europe, and 13 July in North America.

Soilwork announced on 26 June 2012 that Peter Wichers has left Soilwork for the second time. Following the departure, Peter was replaced by David Andersson.

Strid began to think of the band's next album as a double album during a 2011 tour. He wanted to challenge himself, instead of releasing a single album after Wicher's departure. He also wanted to show that the band could release a great album with one of their main composers gone. He wrote two songs by the end of the year, and began writing with the band in March 2012. Soilwork announced they would begin recording 23 August 2012.

The album, titled The Living Infinite, was released on 27 February 2013 in Asia, 1 March in Europe, 4 March in the UK and 5 March in North America.

On 24 September 2014, Soilwork released an EP, Beyond the Infinite only in Asia. The EP consists of 5 unreleased tracks from the band's The Living Infinite album sessions.

On 5 December 2014, Soilwork frontman Strid confirmed that work had begun on a new album when he posted a picture on Facebook of him listening to new demos. Strid also stated that Soilwork are sounding "better than ever". It was also confirmed that Soilwork had teamed up with Testament frontman Chuck Billy's Breaking Bands LLC management company for the album.

In June 2015, Soilwork announced that longtime bassist Ola Flink and the band had parted ways and that he would be replaced by new bassist Markus Wibom.

Soilwork supported Soulfly on their 2015 We Sold Our Souls To Metal Tour. Decapitated and Shattered Sun also joins the tour, scheduled for a 27 concert trek starting on 30 September and ending in Albuquerque, NM on 30 October. Then, Soilwork goes on a European tour as headliner with HateSphere and French band T.A.N.K.

Departure of Dirk Verbeuren and more albums (2016–present) 
On 15 July 2016, it was announced that long time drummer Dirk Verbeuren had left the band to join Megadeth.

On 19 August 2016, Soilwork released a compilation album, Death Resonance, which featured a number of B-sides and rarities from five of their previous albums in addition to two new songs.

On 11 January 2019, Soilwork released Verkligheten, their first album with new drummer Bastian Thusgaard, and their first album in nearly four years. On 14 June 2019, the band officially released the Underworld EP, which consists of bonus tracks originally previously only available on physical editions of the band's recent Verkligheten album.

On 4 December 2020, Soilwork released an EP A Whisp of the Atlantic, which is composed of songs the band recorded and released from late 2019 to mid 2020, along with the ambitious 16-minute title-piece that opens the EP.

Soilwork announced in early 2022 that bassist Rasmus Ehrnborn had joined the band officially and contributed to the band's twelfth studio album, Övergivenheten, which was released on 19 August 2022.

On 14 September 2022, it was announced that guitarist and songwriter David Andersson, who had been in the band for 10 years, died at the age of 47. Touring guitarist Simon Johansson who had been touring with the band since 2019 was made a permanent member on March 13, 2023.

Band members 

Current members
 Björn "Speed" Strid – vocals (1995–present)
 Sven Karlsson – keyboards (2001–present)
 Sylvain Coudret – guitars (2008–present)
 Bastian Thusgaard – drums (2016–present)
 Rasmus Ehrnborn – bass (2022–present; touring 2019–2022)
 Simon Johansson – guitars  (2023–present; touring 2019–2023)

Discography 

Studio albums
 Steelbath Suicide (1998)
 The Chainheart Machine (2000)
 A Predator's Portrait (2001)
 Natural Born Chaos (2002)
 Figure Number Five (2003)
 Stabbing the Drama (2005)
 Sworn to a Great Divide (2007)
 The Panic Broadcast (2010)
 The Living Infinite (2013)
 The Ride Majestic (2015)
 Verkligheten (2019)
 Övergivenheten (2022)

References

External links 

 
 
 
 Soilwork's Myspace profile
 
 HardRadio.com interview with Bjorn Strid on Soilwork, Ozzfest, and Scandinavian Metal

1996 establishments in Sweden
Musical groups established in 1996
Musical groups from Helsingborg
Nuclear Blast artists
Swedish heavy metal musical groups
Swedish melodic death metal musical groups
Listenable Records artists
Century Media Records artists